Ezra Baker (c. 1765 – ?) was a U.S. Representative from New Jersey.

Born in Tuckerton, New Jersey, Baker moved with his parents to the Province of East Jersey about 1765. He was educated for the medical profession and commenced practice. He moved to Absecon, New Jersey, in 1799. He served as collector of customs at the port of Great Egg Harbor, New Jersey, February 18, 1813 to March 1, 1815.

Baker was elected as a Democratic-Republican to the Fourteenth Congress (March 4, 1815 – March 3, 1817). He moved westward to the "Wabash country" with his sons in 1818 and engaged in the culture of castor beans for the New Orleans market; he died there at an unknown date.

References

1760s births
19th-century deaths
Year of death unknown
Democratic-Republican Party members of the United States House of Representatives from New Jersey
People from Tuckerton, New Jersey
People from Absecon, New Jersey